Shlomo Glickstein (born 6 January 1958) is an Israeli former professional tennis player.

He reached his career-high singles ranking of World No. 22 in November 1982, and his career-high doubles ranking of World No. 28 in February 1986.

Early and personal life
Glickstein was born in Rehovot, Israel, lives in Ashkelon, Israel, and is Jewish. His parents immigrated to Israel from Poland. He served in the Israel Defense Forces for three years, from the ages of 18 to 21, rising to the rank of sergeant.

Tennis career

In 1980, Glickstein defeated World No. 35 Raúl Ramírez in the first round at Wimbledon. He lost to Björn Borg (the eventual tournament winner) in the second round, but won the Wimbledon Plate in a consolation tournament.

Glickstein's victories include wins against World No. 1 Ivan Lendl 6–2, 3–6, 7–5; No. 9 Harold Solomon; No. 10 Eliot Teltscher; and No. 11 Brian Gottfried.

Glickstein retired in 1988. He served as director of the Israel Tennis Academy in Ramat Hasharon from 1992–96.

In the spring of 1998 he was still managing the Israeli Davis Cup and Fed Cup teams.

Davis Cup
Glickstein was 44–22, and 22–4 on hard courts, in Davis Cup play from 1976–87.  He is Israel's all-time leader in total wins, singles wins (31), and doubles wins (13).  As of 2008, his 44 wins was twice that of the Israeli with the second-most Davis Cup wins, Amos Mansdorf.

Maccabiah Games
Glickstein won the gold medal in men's singles in tennis at the 1981 Maccabiah Games, the first Israeli to win a Maccabiah tennis championship.

Miscellaneous
Glickstein trained at Israel Tennis Centers.

Grand Slam finals

Doubles (1 runner-up)

Career finals

Singles: 2 titles

See also
 List of select Jewish tennis players

References

External links 

 
 
 
 Jewish Sports Hall of Fame
 Great Jews in Sports
 Jews in Sports bio

1958 births
Living people
Israeli people of Polish-Jewish descent
Israeli Jews
Jewish tennis players
Israeli male tennis players
People from Rehovot
People from Ashkelon
Maccabiah Games medalists in tennis
Maccabiah Games gold medalists for Israel
Competitors at the 1981 Maccabiah Games